Yule Ranch (now Three V Ranch) is a historic property in Golden Valley and Slope counties in North Dakota, United States.

Background
Founded in 1883 by John Pender as the JXL Ranch or Yule Ranch, historically the ranch was a multi-state cattle operation. After changing hands it was renamed as the VVV Ranch in 1937. The VVV brand had previously been established in 1898 at another ranch. At one time it was home to a small community including a post office bearing the name Yule, a general store, and a stage coach stop. The post office closed in 1910. Today the ranch raises Angus cattle, grows cash crops, and caters to hunters looking for mule and whitetail deer, coyotes and sharptail grouse. Theodore Roosevelt enjoyed staying at the ranch and conducted one of his last bison hunting excursions there.

Three V Crossing 

The construction of the crossing was jointly funded by the National Forest Service program and the county. It is part of Forest Development Road (FDR) 7741. Water underneath passes through concrete box culverts. Access across the Missouri River is unreliable when waters are high.

On the east side of the crossing, a geological layer known as the Rhame Bed is characterized by having yellowish sand, with very pale green material underneath.

See also 
 Elkhorn Ranch

References

Buildings and structures in Slope County, North Dakota
Ranches in the United States
Theodore Roosevelt
Buildings and structures in Golden Valley County, North Dakota
1883 establishments in Dakota Territory
Agriculture in North Dakota